

Hans Christern (24 January 1900 – 17 June 1966) was a highly decorated Oberst in the Wehrmacht during World War II.  He was a recipient of the Knight's Cross of the Iron Cross of Nazi Germany. Christern took over command of the 7th Panzer Division in March 1945 which he surrendered to British troops in May 1945 north west of Berlin.

Following the war he worked as a farmer.  He was involved in the CDU, and ran for office in the West German federal election of 1949, but failed to win his seat.

Awards and decorations

 Knight's Cross of the Iron Cross on 31 January 1941 as Major and commander of the II./Panzer-Regiment 31

References

Citations

Bibliography

 

1900 births
1966 deaths
People from Lauenburg (Elbe)
German Army personnel of World War I
Recipients of the clasp to the Iron Cross, 2nd class
Recipients of the Knight's Cross of the Iron Cross
German prisoners of war in World War II held by the United Kingdom
People from the Province of Schleswig-Holstein
Military personnel from Schleswig-Holstein